Huapi is a town of Xinle City in southwestern Hebei province, China, located  southwest of downtown Xinle. , it has 13 villages under its administration.

See also
List of township-level divisions of Hebei

References

Township-level divisions of Hebei